Rafael Dieste (Rianxo, 1899–Santiago de Compostela, 1981) was a Galician poet, philosopher, short-story writer, and dramatist writing mostly in Galician language, but also in Spanish language. He began to write with the encouragement of another Galician poet, Manuel Antonio, wrote for the theatre and wrote widely on aesthics. His stories have been compared to the other-world approach of the graphic art of M. C. Escher.

His nephew was the Uruguayan structural architect Eladio Dieste, whose approach to architecture may have been in sympathy with his uncle's poetry.

Selected works
 Nuevo retablo de las maravillas (1937; The New Marvelous Puppet Show)
 Viaje, duelo y perdición: tragedia, humorada y comedia. 1979
 Viaje y fin de Frontán
 A fiestra baldeira, 1927-1958
 Dos arquivos do trasno, 1926

Further reading

References

1899 births
1981 deaths